The 2012 ADAC Formel Masters season was an open-wheel motor racing series for emerging young racing drivers based out of Germany. It was the fifth season of the ADAC Formel Masters. The season began on 31 March at Motorsport Arena Oschersleben and finished on 30 September at Hockenheim after eight race weekends, totalling 24 races.

The championship was won by German driver Marvin Kirchhöfer.

Season review

The first two poles of the season were claimed at Oschersleben by second-year driver Jeffrey Schmidt for the Lotus team, that was previously known as Motopark Academy. But he was passed by his team-mate Marvin Kirchhöfer on the opening lap of the first race, with Kirchhöfer going on to win his first race in single-seaters. Schmidt and Kirchhöfer collided in the second race, while Thomas Jäger secured his first win in the German series, and the first for his team, Neuhauser Racing, since 2008. Another Lotus driver Kuba Dalewski won the reverse-grid third race of the weekend in his first single-seaters meeting.

Teams and drivers

Race calendar and results
 The 2012 calendar was announced on 29 September 2011. Seven of eight race weekends are a part of the ADAC's Masters Weekend package, with an additional round at the Nürburgring that will support the ADAC Truck Grand Prix.

Notes:
 — The third race at the Sachsenring was abandoned following an accident in which Florian Herzog and Kim-Alexander Giersiepen collided with a course car while marshals were recovering the car of Nicolas Pohler from a gravel trap.

Championship standings

Drivers' Championship
Points are awarded as follows:

Teams' Championship

References

External links
 Official Website 
 ADAC Masters Weekend 

ADAC Formel Masters
ADAC Formel Masters seasons
ADAC Formel Masters